Raigo Mõlder (born 25 March 1982) is an Estonian rally co-driver. He was the co-driver of 2019 World Rally Champion Ott Tänak from 2014 to 2016.

Rally career
Mõlder made his WRC debut at 2009 Rally Finland, where he was the navigator of compatriot Georg Gross in a Subaru Impreza STi N12. His most successful part of career was with Ott Tänak. 

Mõlder achieved his first podium finish at 2015 Rally Poland. A year later, at 2016 Rally Poland, it could be a victory until a puncture dropped the Estonian crew down to second. 

Mõlder and Tänak garnered mainstream attention during the third stage of 2015 Rally México, Los Mexicanos, when the Estonian crew crashed their Ford Fiesta RS WRC into a lake, but both Mõlder and Tänak were able to extract themselves from the car prior to it submerging. The car was recovered from the lake before repaired by the M-Sport World Rally Team and dubbed the TiTänak — a portmanteau of the RMS Titanic passenger liner, that sank in 1912, and Tänak's name. They re-joined the rally on Sunday, finishing 22nd overall and scoring a manufacturers' championship point.

Rally results

WRC results

References

External links

 Raigo Mõlder's e-wrc profile

1982 births
Living people
Estonian rally co-drivers
World Rally Championship co-drivers